X -Cross- (simply read as "Cross") is the 57th studio album released by Japanese kayōkyoku singer Sayuri Ishikawa, celebrating her 40th anniversary in the music industry. She collaborated with Shigeru Kishida of Quruli, Kazufumi Miyazawa of The Boom, Tamio Okuda, Michiru, Hako Yamasaki, Neko Saito, and Hiroko Taniyama to write the tracks on the album. The cover was drawn by JoJo's Bizarre Adventure author Hirohiko Araki, displaying Ishikawa in one of his characters' iconic poses and wearing hair accessories inspired by his works. Ishikawa's performance at the 63rd NHK Kōhaku Uta Gassen would also involve a collaboration with Araki.

The album did not break the top 100 on the Oricon Weekly Album Charts, only reaching 127 with two weeks spent on the charts.

Track listing

References

See also 
Sayuri Ishikawa discography

2012 albums
Sayuri Ishikawa albums